Ceinidae is a family of amphipods. Until 1972, they were considered part of the family Phliantidae. Some genera previously included in this family have been transferred to the family Hyalidae.

References

Gammaridea